Abu l-Hasan 'Ali Ibn Nafi, better known as  Ziryab, Zeryab, or Zaryab ( 789– 857) ( Zaryāb), was a singer, oud and lute player, composer, poet, and teacher who lived and worked in Iraq, Northern Africa, and Andalusia during the medieval Islamic period. He was also known as a polymath, with knowledge in astronomy, geography, meteorology, botanics, cosmetics, culinary art, and fashion. His nickname "Ziryab", comes from the Persian word for jay-bird , pronounced "Zaryāb". He was active at the Umayyad court of Córdoba in Islamic Iberia. His first achieved fame, was at the Abbasid court in Baghdad, Iraq, his birthplace, as a performer and student of the great Persian musician and composer, Ibrahim al-Mawsili.

Ziryab was a gifted pupil of Ibrahim al-Mawsili in Baghdad, where Ziryab got his beginner lessons. However, he left Baghdad during the reign of the Abbasid caliph al-Ma'mun and moved to Córdoba, where he was accepted as a court musician in the court of Abd ar-Rahman II of the Umayyad Dynasty.

Ethnic origin
Ziryab's career flourished in Al-Andalus. According to the Encyclopaedia of Islam, he was born around 175 AH/790 into a family of mawali of the caliph al-Mahdi. His ethnic origin is disputed, different sources list him as either Persian, Kurdish, or African. According to Ibn Hayyan, ‘Ali Ibn Nafi’ was called Blackbird because of his extremely dark complexion, the clarity of his voice and “the sweetness of his character.”

Historical context/early life
As the Islamic armies conquered more and more territories, their musical culture spread with them, as far as western China in the east and Iberia in the west. After their 8th century conquest of nearly all of Hispania, which they renamed Al-Andalus, the Muslims were a small minority for quite some time, greatly outnumbered by the majority Christians and a smaller community of Jews, who had their own styles of music. With their arrival, the Muslims and Arabs introduced new styles of music, and the main cities of Iberia soon became well-known centers for music within the Islamic world. During the 8th and 9th centuries, many musicians and artists from across the Islamic world flocked to Iberia. While many were talented, Ziryab surpassed them all.

Ziryab was most likely born in Baghdad and was trained in the art of music from a young age. During that time, Baghdad was an important center of music in the Muslim world. The sources all agree that the accomplished and talented musician Ibrahim al-Mawsili was Ziryab's teacher. There is some debate about how he arrived in al-Andalus, but he may have offended his patron or some powerful figure with his musical talent.

One account recorded by al-Maqqari says that Ziryab inspired the jealousy of his mentor by giving an impressive performance for the caliph Harun al-Rashid (d. 809), with the result that al-Mawsili told him to leave the city. Earlier, more reliable sources indicate that he outlived both Harun and his son al-Amin and left after al-Amin's death in 813.

Ziryab left Baghdad during the reign of al-Ma'mun some time after the year 813. He then traveled first to Syria and then Ifriqiya (Tunisia), where he lived at the Aghlabid court of Ziyadat Allah (ruled 816–837). Ziryab fell out with Ziyadat Allah but was invited to Al-Andalus by the Umayyad prince, Al-Hakam I (ruled 796–822). He found on arrival in 822 that the prince had died, but the prince's son, Abd ar-Rahman II, renewed his father's invitation. Ziryab settled in Córdoba he has honored a monthly salary of 200 Gold Dinars, and he soon became even more celebrated as the court's aficionado of food, fashion, singing, and music. He introduced standards of excellence in all these fields as well as setting new norms for elegant and noble manners. Ziryab became such a prominent cultural figure and was given a huge salary from Abd al Rahman II. He was an intimate companion of the prince and established a school of music that trained singers and musicians which influenced musical performance for at least two generations after him.

Al-Maqqari states in his Nafh al-Tib (Fragrant Breeze): "There never was, either before or after him (Ziryab), a man of his profession who was more generally beloved and admired".

Music
Ziryab is said to have improved the Oud (or Laúd) by adding a fifth pair of strings, and using an eagle's beak or quill instead of a wooden pick. Ziryab also dyed the four strings a color to symbolize the Aristotelian humors, and the fifth string to represent the soul. He is said to have created a unique and influential style of musical performance, and written songs that were performed in Iberia for generations. He was a great influence on Spanish music, and is considered the founder of the Andalusian music traditions of North Africa.

Ziryab's Baghdadi musical style became very popular in the court of Abd al-Rahman II. Ziryab also became the example of how a courtier, a person who attended aristocratic courts, should act. According to Ibn Hayyan, in common with erudite men of his time he was well versed in many areas of classical study such as astronomy, history, and geography.

According to al-Tifashi, Ziryab appears to have popularized an early song-sequence, which may have been a precursor to the nawba (originally simply a performer's "turn" to perform for the prince), or Nuba, which is known today as the classical Arabic music of North Africa, though the connections are tenuous at best.

Abd al-Rahman II was a great patron of the arts and Ziryab was given a great deal of freedom. He established one of the first schools of music in Córdoba. This school incorporated both male and female students, who were very popular amongst the aristocracy of the time. According to Ibn Hayyan, Ziryab developed various tests for them. If a student didn't have a large vocal capacity, for instance, he would put pieces of wood in their jaw to force them to hold their mouth open. Or he would tie a sash tightly around the waist to make them breathe in a particular way, and he would test incoming students by having them sing as loudly and as long a note as they possibly could to see whether they had lung capacity.

Family
According to the main source, Ibn Hayyan, Ziryab had eight sons and two daughters. Five of the sons and both daughters became musicians of some prominence. These children kept their father's music school alive, but the female slave singers he trained also were regarded as reliable sources for his repertoire in the following generation.

Fashion and hygiene
Ziryab started a vogue by changing clothes according to the weather and season. He suggested different clothing for mornings, afternoons and evenings. Henri Terrasse, a French historian of North Africa, commented that legend attributes winter and summer clothing styles and "the luxurious dress of the Orient" found in Morocco today to Ziryab, but argues that "Without a doubt, a lone man could not achieve this transformation. It is rather a development which shook the Muslim world in general ..."

He created a new type of deodorant to get rid of bad odors and also promoted morning and evening baths and emphasized the maintenance of personal hygiene. Ziryab is thought to have invented an early toothpaste, which he popularized throughout Islamic Iberia. The exact ingredients of this toothpaste are not currently known, but it was reported to have been both "functional and pleasant to taste".

According to Al-Maqqari before the arrival of Ziryab, all the people of al-Andalus, in the Cordoban court, wore their long hair parted in the middle and hung down loose down to the shoulders, men and women; Ziryab had his hair cut with bangs down to his eyebrows and straight across his forehead, "new short hairstyles leaving the neck, ears and eyebrows free,". He popularized shaving among men and set new haircut trends. Royalty used to wash their hair with rose water, but Ziryab introduced the use of salt and fragrant oils to improve the hair's condition. He is alleged by some to have opened beauty parlors for women of the Cordoban elite. However, this is not supported by the early sources.

Ziryab was a "major trendsetter of his time" creating trends in fashion, hairstyles, and hygiene. His students took these trends with them throughout Europe and North Africa.

Cuisine
He was an arbiter of culinary fashion and taste, who also "revolutionized the local cuisine" by introducing new fruit and vegetables such as asparagus, and by introducing the three-course meal served on leathern tablecloths, insisting that meals should be served in three separate courses consisting of soup, the main course, and dessert. He also introduced the use of crystal as a container for drinks, which was more effective than metal. This claim is supported by accounts of him cutting large crystal goblets. Prior to his time, food was served plainly on platters on bare tables, as was the case with the Romans. He is also said to have popularized wine drinking.

Legacy

Ziryab revolutionized the court at Córdoba and made it the stylistic capital of its time. Whether introducing new clothes, styles, foods, hygiene products, or music, Ziryab changed Andalusian culture forever. The musical contributions of Ziryab alone are staggering, laying the early groundwork for classic Spanish music. Ziryab transcended music and style and became a revolutionary cultural figure in 8th and 9th century Iberia.

Ziryab's students took the trends and inventions he started to North Africa and Europe.

Notes

References
Titus Burckhardt, "Die Maurische Kultur in Spanien.
Flight of the Blackbird Robert W. Lebling Jr., Saudi Aramco World July/August 2003.

Other sources
 Encyclopaedia of Islam
 al-Muqtabis by Ibn Hayyan
 The Muqaddima of Ibn Khaldoun, Chapter V, part 31, "The craft of singing."
 Ta'rikh fath al-Andalus by Ibn al-Qutiyya
 al-'Iqd al-farid by Ibn 'Abd Rabbih
 Ta'rikh Baghdad by Ibn Tayfur
 Kitab al-Aghani by Abu l-Faraj al-Isfahani
 Tawq al-hamama by Ibn Hazm
 Jawdhat al-Muqtabis by Al-Humaydī
 Mughrib fi hula l-Maghrib by Ibn Sa'id

Further reading
 Zaryâb Article at Fravahr.org
 Titus Burckhardt, "Die Maurische Kultur in Spanien''.
 Newroz films article
 MuslimHeritage.com article.
 African music pieces, by Elijah Wald
 Flight of the Blackbird, Saudi Aramco World
 The Cultural Icon of al-Andalus at Lost Islamic History
 

780s births
857 deaths
9th-century people from al-Andalus
Islam
Travelers
Geographers from the Abbasid Caliphate
Linguists
Musicians of the medieval Islamic world
9th-century musicians
Medieval slaves
Arabian slaves and freedmen
Medieval Arabic singers
Cuisine of the medieval Islamic world